The Middle East Rally Championship (MERC) is a motor rally championship run under the auspicies of the FIA. First held in 1984 the championship encompasses a series of rallies held across Western Asia. The championship has featured long-running events like Rally of Lebanon, Rally Oman and the Troodos Rally in Cyprus as well as World Rally Championship event Jordan Rally. Many of the rallies in the region pre-date national independence, mostly from the United Kingdom.

The championship has been dominated by Nasser Al-Attiyah who has won 18 titles. 

The championship features events in Qatar, Kuwait, Iran, Lebanon, Cyprus, Jordan, Oman and the United Arab Emirates. The championship has also visited Bahrain, Syria and Saudi Arabia.

List of events
Qatar International Rally (1984–present)
Kuwait International Rally (1984–85, 1987–89, 1995–96, 2009–2016, 2018–present)
Bahrain International Rally (1984, 2000–02, 2004–05)
Jordan Rally (1984–88, 1990, 1992–present)
Oman International Rally (1984–88, 1990–94, 1998, 2004–07, 2015)
Dubai International Rally, United Arab Emirates (1984–88, 1990–95, 1997–2015)
Rally of Lebanon, (1987–88, 1991–2004, 2006–present)
UAE International Rally, United Arab Emirates (1989, 1995–2001, 2004–06)
Tour of Cyprus, (1998–1999)
Troodos Rally, Cyprus, (2000–2009, 2011)
Syria International Rally, (2001–05, 2007–10)
Cyprus Rally, (2007–08, 2010, 2012–present)
Sharqia Rally, Saudi Arabia, (2010)
Shiraz Rally, Iran, (2015–17)

Seasons

2012 season
The 2012 events and winners:

2011 season
The 2011 events and winners:

2010 season
The 2010 events and winners:

Champions

Rally winners
227 Rallies (after Qatar 2023), 39 different winners, following are the winners stats:

Wins per nationality
count as after Qatar 2023

References

External links
 2016 Middle East Rally Championship at the FIA official website

 
Motorsport in the Middle East
FIA Zone rally championships